The Adana–Mersin Main Line is a 67 km (41 miles) long double track rail line from the Adana Railway Station in Adana to the Mersin Railway Station in Mersin. The line passes through the city of Tarsus and has branch lines to the Port of Mersin. The line is one of the busiest rail lines in Turkey with 57 passenger trains and about 20 freight trains daily.

At Yenice, between Tarsus and Adana, the main railroad line north to Ulukışla to the north joins the Adana–Mersin line; at Ulukışla, its two branches continue to Konya and Ankara to the northwest and  Kayseri to the northeast.

History

Mersin–Tarsus–Adana Railway
On January 20, 1883, the Ottoman Government gave a concession to develop railways in Cilicia to two Turkish men. They sold a part of their rights to a group of English and French investors, leading to the establishment of the Mersin–Tarsus–Adana Railway (MTA), a French company headquartered in London. The line was quickly built and opened on August 2, 1886.

In 1896, the Turkish men sold all their rights to the company, making the MTA fully foreign owned. In 1906, Deutsche Bank bought the line from the French company. After World War I and the Turkish Independence War, the line was still owned by the Deutsche Bank. On January 1, 1929, the line was nationalized, as were the Chemins de Fer Ottomans d'Anatolie (CFOA). It became part of the Chemins de fer d'Anatolie Baghdad Railway, which was a part of the Turkish State Railways (TCDD). TCDD operates the line to this day.

The MTA terminal station in Adana was abandoned by the Baghdad Railway which built its own station further north.

References

External links
Trains of Turkey
Mersin Adana Main Line
Adana Mersin train route map and timetable

Ottoman railways
Railway lines in Turkey
Railway lines opened in 1886
Transport in Adana
Çukurova
Standard gauge railways in Turkey
1886 establishments in the Ottoman Empire